

Melting point 

In the following table, the use row is the value recommended for use in other Wikipedia pages in order to maintain consistency across content.

Notes 
 All values at standard pressure (101.325 kPa) unless noted. Triple point temperature values (marked "tp") are not valid at standard pressure.

References

WEL 
As quoted at http://www.webelements.com/ from these sources:
 A.M. James and M.P. Lord in Macmillan's Chemical and Physical Data, Macmillan, London, UK, 1992
 G.W.C. Kaye and T.H. Laby in Tables of physical and chemical constants, Longman, London, UK, 15th edition, 1993

Unit is K.

CRC 

Unit is °C

LNG 
As quoted from:
 J.A. Dean (ed), Lange's Handbook of Chemistry (15th Edition), McGraw-Hill, 1999; Section 3; Table 3.2 Physical Constants of Inorganic Compounds

Unit is °C

Hoffer et al.

Lavrukhina et al.

Holman et al.
Not used in  this table.

Table

See also 

Boiling points of the elements (data page)
List of chemical elements

Properties of chemical elements
Chemical element data pages